The Catawba Rosenwald School is a historic school building at 3071 South Anderson Road United States Route 21) in Catawba, South Carolina.  It is a single-story wood-frame structure, built in 1924–25 with support from the Rosenwald Fund, to one of the fund's architectural plans.  It served as a school for the area's African-American population from then until its closure in 1956.  In 1960 the vacant building was moved within the same property to accommodate the widening of South Anderson Road.  It is one of two surviving Rosenwald schools in York County.  It is owned by the Rock Hill School District.

The building was listed on the National Register of Historic Places in 2013.

References

See also
National Register of Historic Places listings in Rock Hill, South Carolina

School buildings on the National Register of Historic Places in South Carolina
National Register of Historic Places in Rock Hill, South Carolina
Buildings and structures in Rock Hill, South Carolina